J. O. Christian Field was a baseball stadium in Storrs, Connecticut, United States. It was the home field of the Connecticut Huskies baseball team of the NCAA Division I's American Athletic Conference (The American) from 1968 through 2019. The stadium held seating for 2,000 people. It was named after former UConn baseball coach and athletic director, J. Orlean Christian. UConn played their last game at J.O. Christian field on May 11, 2019, with demolition the following month.

In the offseason following the 2011 season, the university announced fundraising efforts for a new baseball stadium. The new stadium was built across the street from the existing J. O. Christian Field, behind the site of the new Morrone Stadium, with room for 1,500. Construction is expected to begin on the athletic complex in mid-2018.  The new facility will include artificial turf to facilitate play early in the season, an indoor training facility, lights, and a scoreboard.

When construction on the full athletics complex (baseball, softball, soccer, and performance center) are complete, a turf field will be built on the site for use by the soccer and lacrosse teams as well as intramural sports.  It will retain the name J. O. Christian Field.

See also
 List of NCAA Division I baseball venues

References

Defunct college baseball venues in the United States
UConn Huskies baseball venues
Sports venues in Tolland County, Connecticut